Louis IX of Hesse-Darmstadt (15 December 1719 – 6 April 1790) was the reigning Landgrave of Hesse-Darmstadt from 1768 to 1790. 

Louis IX and his wife Countess Palatine Caroline of Zweibrücken became the most recent common ancestors of all current European monarchs on 8 September 2022 after Queen Elizabeth II of the United Kingdom, who was not a descendant, died and her son, Charles III, a descendant through his father, became king.

Overview
Louis IX was a son of Louis VIII, Landgrave of Hesse-Darmstadt, and Charlotte of Hanau-Lichtenberg and Müntzenberg.

He was born in Darmstadt on 15 December 1719. On 12 August 1741, Louis married Caroline, daughter of Christian III, Duke of Zweibrücken. They had three sons and five daughters, including:

 Princess Caroline of Hesse-Darmstadt (1746–1821), married Frederick V, Landgrave of Hesse-Homburg
 Princess Frederica Louisa of Hesse-Darmstadt (1751–1805), married King Friedrich Wilhelm II of Prussia and became Queen of Prussia
 Prince Louis X (1753–1830), later Grand Duke Louis I, married his first cousin Princess Louise of Hesse-Darmstadt
 Princess Amalie of Hesse-Darmstadt (1754–1832), married her first cousin Karl Ludwig, Hereditary Prince of Baden
 Princess Wilhelmina Louisa of Hessen-Darmstadt (1755–1776), married Grand Duke Pavel Petrovich of Russia, later emperor
 Princess Luise Auguste of Hesse-Darmstadt (1757–1830), married Karl August, Grand Duke of Saxe-Weimar-Eisenach
 Prince Frederick (1759–1802)
 Prince Christian of Hesse-Darmstadt (1763–1830)
 A stillborn son on May 3, 1742

In 1775, Louis IX married Marie Adelaide of Cheirouze, countess of Lemberg. On 6 April 1790 Louis died in Pirmasens.

Ancestry

Royal descendants
Louis IX and his wife became the most recent common ancestors of all current European monarchs on 8 September 2022 after Queen Elizabeth II of the United Kingdom, who is not a descendant, died and her son, Charles III, a descendant through his father, became king.

The lists below show the lines through which each of the 10 current ruling monarchs of Europe is descended from Louis IX and his wife Caroline.

Belgium

 Louis IX and Caroline
 Princess Amalie of Hesse-Darmstadt (1754–1832) m. Charles Louis, Hereditary Prince of Baden
 Charles, Grand Duke of Baden (1786–1818) m. Stéphanie de Beauharnais
 Princess Josephine of Baden (1813–1900) m. Karl Anton, Prince of Hohenzollern
 Princess Marie of Hohenzollern-Sigmaringen (1845–1912) m. Prince Philippe, Count of Flanders
 Albert I of Belgium (1875–1934) m. Duchess Elisabeth in Bavaria
 Leopold III of Belgium (1901–1983) m. Princess Astrid of Sweden
 Albert II of Belgium (1934–) m. Donna Paola Ruffo di Calabria
 Philippe of Belgium (1960–) m. Jonkvrouw Mathilde d'Udekem d'Acoz
 Princess Elisabeth, Duchess of Brabant (2001–)

 Louis IX and Caroline
 Princess Amalie of Hesse-Darmstadt (1754–1832) m. Charles Louis, Hereditary Prince of Baden
 Caroline of Baden (1776–1841) m. Maximilian I Joseph of Bavaria
 Princess Ludovika of Bavaria (1808–1892) m. Duke Maximilian Joseph in Bavaria
 Karl Theodor, Duke in Bavaria (1839–1909) m. Infanta Maria Josepha of Portugal
 Duchess Elisabeth in Bavaria (1876–1965) m. Albert I of Belgium
 Leopold III of Belgium (1901–1983) m. Princess Astrid of Sweden
 Albert II of Belgium (1934–) m. Donna Paola Ruffo di Calabria
 Philippe of Belgium (1960–) m. Jonkvrouw Mathilde d'Udekem d'Acoz
 Princess Elisabeth, Duchess of Brabant (2001–)

 Louis IX and Caroline
 Princess Frederica Louisa of Hesse-Darmstadt (1751–1805), m. Frederick William II of Prussia
 Frederick William III of Prussia (1770–1840) m. Duchess Louise of Mecklenburg-Strelitz
 Princess Louise of Prussia (1808–1870) m. Prince Frederick of the Netherlands
 Princess Louise of the Netherlands (1828–1871) m. Charles XV of Sweden
 Princess Louise of Sweden (1851–1926) m. Frederick VIII of Denmark
 Princess Ingeborg of Denmark (1878–1958) m. Prince Carl, Duke of Västergötland
 Princess Astrid of Sweden (1905–1935) m. Leopold III of Belgium
 Albert II of Belgium (1934–) m. Donna Paola Ruffo di Calabria
 Philippe of Belgium (1960–) m. Jonkvrouw Mathilde d'Udekem d'Acoz
 Princess Elisabeth, Duchess of Brabant (2001–)

 Louis IX and Caroline
 Princess Frederica Louisa of Hesse-Darmstadt (1751–1805), m. Frederick William II of Prussia
 Princess Wilhelmine of Prussia (1774–1837) m. William I of the Netherlands
 Prince Frederick of the Netherlands (1797–1881) m. Princess Louise of Prussia
 Princess Louise of the Netherlands (1828–1871) m. Charles XV of Sweden
 Princess Louise of Sweden (1851–1926) m. Frederick VIII of Denmark
 Princess Ingeborg of Denmark (1878–1958) m. Prince Carl, Duke of Västergötland
 Princess Astrid of Sweden (1905–1935) m. Leopold III of Belgium
 Albert II of Belgium (1934–) m. Donna Paola Ruffo di Calabria
 Philippe of Belgium (1960–) m. Jonkvrouw Mathilde d'Udekem d'Acoz
 Princess Elisabeth, Duchess of Brabant (2001–)

Denmark

 Louis IX and Caroline
 Princess Frederica Louisa of Hesse-Darmstadt (1751–1805), m. Frederick William II of Prussia
 Princess Wilhelmine of Prussia (1774–1837) m. William I of the Netherlands
 Prince Frederick of the Netherlands (1797–1881) m. Princess Louise of Prussia
 Princess Louise of the Netherlands (1828–1871) m. Charles XV of Sweden
 Princess Louise of Sweden (1851–1926) m. Frederick VIII of Denmark
 Christian X of Denmark (1870–1947) m. Duchess Alexandrine of Mecklenburg-Schwerin
 Frederick IX of Denmark (1899–1972) m. Princess Ingrid of Sweden
 Margrethe II of Denmark (1940–) m. Henri de Laborde de Monpezat
 Frederik, Crown Prince of Denmark (1968–) m. Mary Donaldson
 Prince Christian of Denmark (2005–)

 Louis IX and Caroline
 Princess Frederica Louisa of Hesse-Darmstadt (1751–1805), m. Frederick William II of Prussia
 Frederick William III of Prussia (1770–1840) m. Duchess Louise of Mecklenburg-Strelitz
 Princess Louise of Prussia (1808–1870) m. Prince Frederick of the Netherlands
 Princess Louise of the Netherlands (1828–1871) m. Charles XV of Sweden
 Princess Louise of Sweden (1851–1926) m. Frederick VIII of Denmark
 Christian X of Denmark (1870–1947) m. Duchess Alexandrine of Mecklenburg-Schwerin
 Frederick IX of Denmark (1899–1972) m. Princess Ingrid of Sweden
 Margrethe II of Denmark (1940–) m. Henri de Laborde de Monpezat
 Frederik, Crown Prince of Denmark (1968–) m. Mary Donaldson
 Prince Christian of Denmark (2005–)

 Louis IX and Caroline
 Princess Frederica Louisa of Hesse-Darmstadt (1751–1805), m. Frederick William II of Prussia
 Frederick William III of Prussia (1770–1840) m. Duchess Louise of Mecklenburg-Strelitz
 Princess Charlotte of Prussia (1798–1860) m. Nicholas I of Russia
 Grand Duke Michael Nikolaevich of Russia (1832–1909) m. Princess Cecilie of Baden
 Grand Duchess Anastasia Mikhailovna of Russia (1860–1922) m. Frederick Francis III, Grand Duke of Mecklenburg-Schwerin
 Duchess Alexandrine of Mecklenburg-Schwerin (1879–1952) m. Christian X of Denmark
 Frederick IX of Denmark (1899–1972) m. Princess Ingrid of Sweden
 Margrethe II of Denmark (1940–) m. Henri de Laborde de Monpezat
 Frederik, Crown Prince of Denmark (1968–) m. Mary Donaldson
 Prince Christian of Denmark (2005–)

 Louis IX and Caroline
 Princess Frederica Louisa of Hesse-Darmstadt (1751–1805), m. Frederick William II of Prussia
 Frederick William III of Prussia (1770–1840) m. Duchess Louise of Mecklenburg-Strelitz
 Princess Alexandrine of Prussia (1803–1892) m. Paul Frederick, Grand Duke of Mecklenburg-Schwerin
 Frederick Francis II, Grand Duke of Mecklenburg-Schwerin (1823–1883) m. Princess Augusta Reuss of Köstritz
 Frederick Francis III, Grand Duke of Mecklenburg-Schwerin (1851–1897) m. Grand Duchess Anastasia Mikhailovna of Russia
 Duchess Alexandrine of Mecklenburg-Schwerin (1879–1952) m. Christian X of Denmark
 Frederick IX of Denmark (1899–1972) m. Princess Ingrid of Sweden
 Margrethe II of Denmark (1940–) m. Henri de Laborde de Monpezat
 Frederik, Crown Prince of Denmark (1968–) m. Mary Donaldson
 Prince Christian of Denmark (2005–)

 Louis IX and Caroline
 Princess Amalie of Hesse-Darmstadt (1754–1832) m. Charles Louis, Hereditary Prince of Baden
 Princess Frederica of Baden (1781–1826) m. Gustav IV Adolf of Sweden
 Princess Sophie of Sweden (1801–1865) m. Leopold, Grand Duke of Baden
 Princess Cecilie of Baden (1839–1891) m. Grand Duke Michael Nikolaevich of Russia
 Grand Duchess Anastasia Mikhailovna of Russia (1860–1922) m. Frederick Francis III, Grand Duke of Mecklenburg-Schwerin
 Duchess Alexandrine of Mecklenburg-Schwerin (1879–1952) m. Christian X of Denmark
 Frederick IX of Denmark (1899–1972) m. Princess Ingrid of Sweden
 Margrethe II of Denmark (1940–) m. Henri de Laborde de Monpezat
 Frederik, Crown Prince of Denmark (1968–) m. Mary Donaldson
 Prince Christian of Denmark (2005–)

 Louis IX and Caroline
 Princess Amalie of Hesse-Darmstadt (1754–1832) m. Charles Louis, Hereditary Prince of Baden
 Princess Frederica of Baden (1781–1826) m. Gustav IV Adolf of Sweden
 Princess Sophie of Sweden (1801–1865) m. Leopold, Grand Duke of Baden
 Frederick I, Grand Duke of Baden (1826–1907) m. Princess Louise of Prussia
 Princess Victoria of Baden (1862–1930) m. Gustaf V of Sweden
 Gustaf VI Adolf of Sweden (1882–1973) m. Princess Margaret of Connaught 
 Princess Ingrid of Sweden (1910–2000) m. Frederick IX of Denmark
 Margrethe II of Denmark (1940–) m. Henri de Laborde de Monpezat
 Frederik, Crown Prince of Denmark (1968–) m. Mary Donaldson
 Prince Christian of Denmark (2005–)

 Louis IX and Caroline
 Princess Frederica Louisa of Hesse-Darmstadt (1751–1805) m. Frederick William II of Prussia
 Frederick William III of Prussia (1770–1840) m. Duchess Louise of Mecklenburg-Strelitz
 William I, German Emperor (1797–1888) m. Princess Augusta of Saxe-Weimar-Eisenach
 Princess Louise of Prussia (1838–1923) m. Frederick I, Grand Duke of Baden
 Gustaf VI Adolf of Sweden (1882–1973) m. Princess Margaret of Connaught 
 Princess Ingrid of Sweden (1910–2000) m. Frederick IX of Denmark
 Margrethe II of Denmark (1940–) m. Henri de Laborde de Monpezat
 Frederik, Crown Prince of Denmark (1968–) m. Mary Donaldson
 Prince Christian of Denmark (2005–)

 Louis IX and Caroline
 Princess Louise of Hesse-Darmstadt (1757–1830) m. Karl August, Grand Duke of Saxe-Weimar-Eisenach
 Charles Frederick, Grand Duke of Saxe-Weimar-Eisenach (1783–1853) m. Grand Duchess Maria Pavlovna of Russia
 Princess Augusta of Saxe-Weimar-Eisenach (1811–1890) m. William I, German Emperor
 Princess Louise of Prussia (1838–1923) m. Frederick I, Grand Duke of Baden
 Gustaf VI Adolf of Sweden (1882–1973) m. Princess Margaret of Connaught 
 Princess Ingrid of Sweden (1910–2000) m. Frederick IX of Denmark
 Margrethe II of Denmark (1940–) m. Henri de Laborde de Monpezat
 Frederik, Crown Prince of Denmark (1968–) m. Mary Donaldson
 Prince Christian of Denmark (2005–)

 Louis IX and Caroline
 Princess Frederica Louisa of Hesse-Darmstadt (1751–1805), m. Frederick William II of Prussia
 Frederick William III of Prussia (1770–1840) m. Duchess Louise of Mecklenburg-Strelitz
 Prince Charles of Prussia (1801–1883) m. Princess Marie of Saxe-Weimar-Eisenach
 Prince Friedrich Karl of Prussia (1828–1885) m. Princess Maria Anna of Anhalt-Dessau
 Princess Louise Margaret of Prussia (1860–1917) m. Prince Arthur, Duke of Connaught and Strathearn
 Princess Margaret of Connaught (1882–1920) m. Gustaf VI Adolf of Sweden
 Princess Ingrid of Sweden (1910–2000) m. Frederick IX of Denmark
 Margrethe II of Denmark (1940–) m. Henri de Laborde de Monpezat
 Frederik, Crown Prince of Denmark (1968–) m. Mary Donaldson
 Prince Christian of Denmark (2005–)

 Louis IX and Caroline
 Princess Louise of Hesse-Darmstadt (1757–1830) m. Karl August, Grand Duke of Saxe-Weimar-Eisenach
 Charles Frederick, Grand Duke of Saxe-Weimar-Eisenach (1783–1853) m. Grand Duchess Maria Pavlovna of Russia
 Princess Marie of Saxe-Weimar-Eisenach (1808–1877) m. Prince Charles of Prussia
 Prince Friedrich Karl of Prussia (1828–1885) m. Princess Maria Anna of Anhalt-Dessau
 Princess Louise Margaret of Prussia (1860–1917) m. Prince Arthur, Duke of Connaught and Strathearn
 Princess Margaret of Connaught (1882–1920) m. Gustaf VI Adolf of Sweden
 Princess Ingrid of Sweden (1910–2000) m. Frederick IX of Denmark
 Margrethe II of Denmark (1940–) m. Henri de Laborde de Monpezat
 Frederik, Crown Prince of Denmark (1968–) m. Mary Donaldson
 Prince Christian of Denmark (2005–)

 Louis IX and Caroline
 Princess Frederica Louisa of Hesse-Darmstadt (1751–1805) m. Frederick William II of Prussia
 Prince Louis Charles of Prussia (1773–1796) m. Duchess Frederica of Mecklenburg-Strelitz
 Princess Frederica of Prussia (1796–1850) m. Leopold IV, Duke of Anhalt
 Princess Maria Anna of Anhalt-Dessau (1837–1906) m. Prince Friedrich Karl of Prussia
 Princess Louise Margaret of Prussia (1860–1917) m. Prince Arthur, Duke of Connaught and Strathearn
 Princess Margaret of Connaught (1882–1920) m. Gustaf VI Adolf of Sweden
 Princess Ingrid of Sweden (1910–2000) m. Frederick IX of Denmark
 Margrethe II of Denmark (1940–) m. Henri de Laborde de Monpezat
 Frederik, Crown Prince of Denmark (1968–) m. Mary Donaldson
 Prince Christian of Denmark (2005–)

 Louis IX and Caroline
 Princess Caroline of Hesse-Darmstadt (1746–1821) m. Frederick V, Landgrave of Hesse-Homburg
 Princess Amalie of Hesse-Homburg (1774–1846) m. Frederick, Hereditary Prince of Anhalt-Dessau
 Leopold IV, Duke of Anhalt (1794–1871) m. Princess Frederica of Prussia
 Princess Maria Anna of Anhalt-Dessau (1837–1906) m. Prince Friedrich Karl of Prussia
 Princess Louise Margaret of Prussia (1860–1917) m. Prince Arthur, Duke of Connaught and Strathearn
 Princess Margaret of Connaught (1882–1920) m. Gustaf VI Adolf of Sweden
 Princess Ingrid of Sweden (1910–2000) m. Frederick IX of Denmark
 Margrethe II of Denmark (1940–) m. Henri de Laborde de Monpezat
 Frederik, Crown Prince of Denmark (1968–) m. Mary Donaldson
 Prince Christian of Denmark (2005–)

Liechtenstein

 Louis IX and Caroline
 Princess Amalie of Hesse-Darmstadt (1754–1832) m. Charles Louis, Hereditary Prince of Baden
 Caroline of Baden (1776–1841) m. Maximilian I Joseph of Bavaria
 Princess Sophie of Bavaria (1805–1872) m. Archduke Franz Karl of Austria
 Archduke Karl Ludwig of Austria (1833–1896) m. Infanta Maria Theresa of Portugal
 Archduchess Elisabeth Amalie of Austria (1878–1960) m. Prince Aloys of Liechtenstein
 Franz Joseph II, Prince of Liechtenstein (1906–1989) m. Countess Georgina von Wilczek
 Hans-Adam II, Prince of Liechtenstein (1945–) m. Countess Marie Kinsky of Wchinitz and Tettau
 Alois, Hereditary Prince and Regent of Liechtenstein (1968–) m. Duchess Sophie in Bavaria
 Prince Joseph Wenzel of Liechtenstein (1995–)

 Louis IX and Caroline
 Princess Amalie of Hesse-Darmstadt (1754–1832) m. Charles Louis, Hereditary Prince of Baden
 Caroline of Baden (1776–1841) m. Maximilian I Joseph of Bavaria
 Princess Ludovika of Bavaria (1808–1892) m. Duke Maximilian Joseph in Bavaria
 Karl Theodor, Duke in Bavaria (1839–1909) m. Infanta Maria Josepha of Portugal
 Duchess Marie Gabrielle in Bavaria (1878–1912) m. Rupprecht, Crown Prince of Bavaria
 Albrecht, Duke of Bavaria (1905–1996) m. Countess Maria Draskovich de Trakostjan
 Prince Max, Duke in Bavaria (1937–) m. Countess Elisabeth Douglas
 Duchess Sophie in Bavaria (1968–) m. Alois, Hereditary Prince and Regent of Liechtenstein
 Prince Joseph Wenzel of Liechtenstein (1995–)

Luxembourg

 Louis IX and Caroline
 Princess Caroline of Hesse-Darmstadt (1746–1821) m. Frederick V, Landgrave of Hesse-Homburg
 Princess Amalie of Hesse-Homburg (1774–1846) m. Frederick, Hereditary Prince of Anhalt-Dessau
 Prince Frederick Augustus of Anhalt-Dessau (1799–1864) m. Princess Marie Luise Charlotte of Hesse-Kassel
 Princess Adelheid-Marie of Anhalt-Dessau (1833–1916) m. Adolphe, Grand Duke of Luxembourg
 William IV, Grand Duke of Luxembourg (1852–1912) m. Infanta Marie Anne of Portugal
 Charlotte, Grand Duchess of Luxembourg (1896–1985) m. Prince Felix of Bourbon-Parma
 Jean, Grand Duke of Luxembourg (1921–2019) m. Princess Joséphine-Charlotte of Belgium
 Henri, Grand Duke of Luxembourg (1955–) m. María Teresa Mestre y Batista
 Guillaume, Hereditary Grand Duke of Luxembourg (1981–) m. Countess Stéphanie de Lannoy
 Prince Charles of Luxembourg (2020–)

 Louis IX and Caroline
 Princess Amalie of Hesse-Darmstadt (1754–1832) m. Charles Louis, Hereditary Prince of Baden
 Charles, Grand Duke of Baden (1786–1818) m. Stéphanie de Beauharnais
 Princess Josephine of Baden (1813–1900) m. Karl Anton, Prince of Hohenzollern
 Princess Marie of Hohenzollern-Sigmaringen (1845–1912) m. Prince Philippe, Count of Flanders
 Albert I of Belgium (1875–1934) m. Duchess Elisabeth in Bavaria
 Leopold III of Belgium (1901–1983) m. Princess Astrid of Sweden
 Princess Joséphine-Charlotte of Belgium (1927–2005) m. Jean, Grand Duke of Luxembourg
 Henri, Grand Duke of Luxembourg (1955–) m. María Teresa Mestre y Batista
 Guillaume, Hereditary Grand Duke of Luxembourg (1981–) m. Countess Stéphanie de Lannoy
 Prince Charles of Luxembourg (2020–)

 Louis IX and Caroline
 Princess Amalie of Hesse-Darmstadt (1754–1832) m. Charles Louis, Hereditary Prince of Baden
 Caroline of Baden (1776–1841) m. Maximilian I Joseph of Bavaria
 Princess Ludovika of Bavaria (1808–1892) m. Duke Maximilian Joseph in Bavaria
 Karl Theodor, Duke in Bavaria (1839–1909) m. Infanta Maria Josepha of Portugal
 Duchess Elisabeth in Bavaria (1876–1965) m. Albert I of Belgium
 Leopold III of Belgium (1901–1983) m. Princess Astrid of Sweden
 Princess Joséphine-Charlotte of Belgium (1927–2005) m. Jean, Grand Duke of Luxembourg
 Henri, Grand Duke of Luxembourg (1955–) m. María Teresa Mestre y Batista
 Guillaume, Hereditary Grand Duke of Luxembourg (1981–) m. Countess Stéphanie de Lannoy
 Prince Charles of Luxembourg (2020–)

 Louis IX and Caroline
 Princess Frederica Louisa of Hesse-Darmstadt (1751–1805), m. Frederick William II of Prussia
 Frederick William III of Prussia (1770–1840) m. Duchess Louise of Mecklenburg-Strelitz
 Princess Louise of Prussia (1808–1870) m. Prince Frederick of the Netherlands
 Princess Louise of the Netherlands (1828–1871) m. Charles XV of Sweden
 Princess Louise of Sweden (1851–1926) m. Frederick VIII of Denmark
 Princess Ingeborg of Denmark (1878–1958) m. Prince Carl, Duke of Västergötland
 Princess Astrid of Sweden (1905–1935) m. Leopold III of Belgium
 Princess Joséphine-Charlotte of Belgium (1927–2005) m. Jean, Grand Duke of Luxembourg
 Henri, Grand Duke of Luxembourg (1955–) m. María Teresa Mestre y Batista
 Guillaume, Hereditary Grand Duke of Luxembourg (1981–) m. Countess Stéphanie de Lannoy
 Prince Charles of Luxembourg (2020–)

 Louis IX and Caroline
 Princess Frederica Louisa of Hesse-Darmstadt (1751–1805), m. Frederick William II of Prussia
 Princess Wilhelmine of Prussia (1774–1837) m. William I of the Netherlands
 Prince Frederick of the Netherlands (1797–1881) m. Princess Louise of Prussia
 Princess Louise of the Netherlands (1828–1871) m. Charles XV of Sweden
 Princess Louise of Sweden (1851–1926) m. Frederick VIII of Denmark
 Princess Ingeborg of Denmark (1878–1958) m. Prince Carl, Duke of Västergötland
 Princess Astrid of Sweden (1905–1935) m. Leopold III of Belgium
 Princess Joséphine-Charlotte of Belgium (1927–2005) m. Jean, Grand Duke of Luxembourg
 Henri, Grand Duke of Luxembourg (1955–) m. María Teresa Mestre y Batista
 Guillaume, Hereditary Grand Duke of Luxembourg (1981–) m. Countess Stéphanie de Lannoy
 Prince Charles of Luxembourg (2020–)

Monaco

 Louis IX and Caroline
 Princess Amalie of Hesse-Darmstadt (1754–1832) m. Charles Louis, Hereditary Prince of Baden
 Charles, Grand Duke of Baden (1786–1818) m. Stéphanie de Beauharnais
 Princess Marie Amelie of Baden (1817–1888) m. William Hamilton, 11th Duke of Hamilton
 Lady Mary Victoria Douglas-Hamilton (1850–1922) m. Albert I, Prince of Monaco
 Louis II, Prince of Monaco (1870–1949) w. Marie Juliette Louvet
 Princess Charlotte, Duchess of Valentinois (1898–1977) m. Count Pierre de Polignac
 Rainier III, Prince of Monaco (1923–2005) m. Grace Kelly
 Albert II, Prince of Monaco (1958–) m. Charlene Wittstock
 Jacques, Hereditary Prince of Monaco (2014–)

Netherlands

 Louis IX and Caroline
 Princess Frederica Louisa of Hesse-Darmstadt (1751–1805), m. Frederick William II of Prussia
 Princess Wilhelmine of Prussia (1774–1837) m. William I of the Netherlands
 William II of the Netherlands (1792–1849) m. Grand Duchess Anna Pavlovna of Russia
 William III of the Netherlands (1817–1890) m. Princess Emma of Waldeck and Pyrmont
 Wilhelmina of the Netherlands (1880–1962) m. Duke Henry of Mecklenburg-Schwerin
 Juliana of the Netherlands (1909–2004) m. Prince Bernhard of Lippe-Biesterfeld
 Beatrix of the Netherlands (1938–) m. Klaus von Amsberg
 Willem-Alexander of the Netherlands (1967–) m. Máxima Zorreguieta Cerruti
 Catharina-Amalia, Princess of Orange (2003–)

 Louis IX and Caroline
 Princess Frederica Louisa of Hesse-Darmstadt (1751–1805), m. Frederick William II of Prussia
 Frederick William III of Prussia (1770–1840) m. Duchess Louise of Mecklenburg-Strelitz
 Princess Alexandrine of Prussia (1803–1892) m. Paul Frederick, Grand Duke of Mecklenburg-Schwerin
 Frederick Francis II, Grand Duke of Mecklenburg-Schwerin (1823–1883) m. Princess Marie of Schwarzburg-Rudolstadt
 Duke Henry of Mecklenburg-Schwerin (1876–1934) m. Wilhelmina of the Netherlands
 Juliana of the Netherlands (1909–2004) m. Prince Bernhard of Lippe-Biesterfeld
 Beatrix of the Netherlands (1938–) m. Klaus von Amsberg
 Willem-Alexander of the Netherlands (1967–) m. Máxima Zorreguieta Cerruti
 Catharina-Amalia, Princess of Orange (2003–)

 Louis IX and Caroline
 Princess Caroline of Hesse-Darmstadt (1746–1821) m. Frederick V, Landgrave of Hesse-Homburg
 Princess Caroline of Hesse-Homburg (1771–1854) m. Louis Frederick II, Prince of Schwarzburg-Rudolstadt
 Princess Thekla of Schwarzburg-Rudolstadt (1795–1861) m. Otto Victor, Prince of Schönburg-Waldenburg
 Princess Mathilde of Schonburg-Waldenburg (1826–1914) m. Prince Adolph of Schwarzburg-Rudolstadt
 Princess Marie of Schwarzburg-Rudolstadt (1850–1922) m. Frederick Francis II, Grand Duke of Mecklenburg-Schwerin
 Duke Henry of Mecklenburg-Schwerin (1876–1934) m. Wilhelmina of the Netherlands
 Juliana of the Netherlands (1909–2004) m. Prince Bernhard of Lippe-Biesterfeld
 Beatrix of the Netherlands (1938–) m. Klaus von Amsberg
 Willem-Alexander of the Netherlands (1967–) m. Máxima Zorreguieta Cerruti
 Catharina-Amalia, Princess of Orange (2003–)

 Louis IX and Caroline
 Princess Caroline of Hesse-Darmstadt (1746–1821) m. Frederick V, Landgrave of Hesse-Homburg
 Princess Louise Ulrike of Hesse-Homburg (1771–1854) m. Prince Charles Günther of Schwarzburg-Rudolstadt
 Prince Adolph of Schwarzburg-Rudolstadt (1801–1875) m. Princess Mathilde of Schonburg-Waldenburg
 Princess Marie of Schwarzburg-Rudolstadt (1850–1922) m. Frederick Francis II, Grand Duke of Mecklenburg-Schwerin
 Duke Henry of Mecklenburg-Schwerin (1876–1934) m. Wilhelmina of the Netherlands
 Juliana of the Netherlands (1909–2004) m. Prince Bernhard of Lippe-Biesterfeld
 Beatrix of the Netherlands (1938–) m. Klaus von Amsberg
 Willem-Alexander of the Netherlands (1967–) m. Máxima Zorreguieta Cerruti
 Catharina-Amalia, Princess of Orange (2003–)

Norway

 Louis IX and Caroline
 Princess Frederica Louisa of Hesse-Darmstadt (1751–1805), m. Frederick William II of Prussia
 Princess Wilhelmine of Prussia (1774–1837) m. William I of the Netherlands
 Prince Frederick of the Netherlands (1797–1881) m. Princess Louise of Prussia
 Princess Louise of the Netherlands (1828–1871) m. Charles XV of Sweden
 Princess Louise of Sweden (1851–1926) m. Frederick VIII of Denmark
 Haakon VII of Norway (1872–1957) m. Princess Maud of Wales
 Olav V of Norway (1903–1991) m. Princess Märtha of Sweden
 Harald V of Norway (1937–) m. Sonja Haraldsen
 Haakon, Crown Prince of Norway (1973–) m. Mette-Marit Tjessem Høiby
 Princess Ingrid Alexandra of Norway (2004–)

 Louis IX and Caroline
 Princess Frederica Louisa of Hesse-Darmstadt (1751–1805), m. Frederick William II of Prussia
 Frederick William III of Prussia (1770–1840) m. Duchess Louise of Mecklenburg-Strelitz
 Princess Louise of Prussia (1808–1870) m. Prince Frederick of the Netherlands
 Princess Louise of the Netherlands (1828–1871) m. Charles XV of Sweden
 Princess Louise of Sweden (1851–1926) m. Frederick VIII of Denmark
 Haakon VII of Norway (1872–1957) m. Princess Maud of Wales
 Olav V of Norway (1903–1991) m. Princess Märtha of Sweden
 Harald V of Norway (1937–) m. Sonja Haraldsen
 Haakon, Crown Prince of Norway (1973–) m. Mette-Marit Tjessem Høiby
 Princess Ingrid Alexandra of Norway (2004–)

 Louis IX and Caroline
 Princess Frederica Louisa of Hesse-Darmstadt (1751–1805), m. Frederick William II of Prussia
 Frederick William III of Prussia (1770–1840) m. Duchess Louise of Mecklenburg-Strelitz
 Princess Louise of Prussia (1808–1870) m. Prince Frederick of the Netherlands
 Princess Louise of the Netherlands (1828–1871) m. Charles XV of Sweden
 Princess Louise of Sweden (1851–1926) m. Frederick VIII of Denmark
 Princess Ingeborg of Denmark (1878–1958) m. Prince Carl, Duke of Västergötland
 Princess Märtha of Sweden (1901–1954) m. Olav V of Norway
 Harald V of Norway (1937–) m. Sonja Haraldsen
 Haakon, Crown Prince of Norway (1973–) m. Mette-Marit Tjessem Høiby
 Princess Ingrid Alexandra of Norway (2004–)

 Louis IX and Caroline
 Princess Frederica Louisa of Hesse-Darmstadt (1751–1805), m. Frederick William II of Prussia
 Princess Wilhelmine of Prussia (1774–1837) m. William I of the Netherlands
 Prince Frederick of the Netherlands (1797–1881) m. Princess Louise of Prussia
 Princess Louise of the Netherlands (1828–1871) m. Charles XV of Sweden
 Princess Louise of Sweden (1851–1926) m. Frederick VIII of Denmark
 Princess Ingeborg of Denmark (1878–1958) m. Prince Carl, Duke of Västergötland
 Princess Märtha of Sweden (1901–1954) m. Olav V of Norway
 Harald V of Norway (1937–) m. Sonja Haraldsen
 Haakon, Crown Prince of Norway (1973–) m. Mette-Marit Tjessem Høiby
 Princess Ingrid Alexandra of Norway (2004–)

Spain

 Louis IX and Caroline
 Louis I, Grand Duke of Hesse (1753–1830) m. Princess Louise of Hesse-Darmstadt
 Louis II, Grand Duke of Hesse (1777–1848) m. Princess Wilhelmine of Baden
 Prince Alexander of Hesse and by Rhine (1823–1888) m. Countess Julia von Hauke
 Prince Henry of Battenberg (1858–1896) m. Princess Beatrice of the United Kingdom
 Princess Victoria Eugenie of Battenberg (1887–1969) m. Alfonso XIII of Spain
 Infante Juan, Count of Barcelona (1913–1993) m. Princess María de las Mercedes of Bourbon-Two Sicilies
 Juan Carlos I of Spain (1938–) m. Princess Sophia of Greece and Denmark
 Felipe VI of Spain (1968–) m. Letizia Ortiz Rocasolano
 Leonor, Princess of Asturias (2005–)

 Louis IX and Caroline
 Princess Amalie of Hesse-Darmstadt (1754–1832) m. Charles Louis, Hereditary Prince of Baden
 Princess Wilhelmine of Baden (1788–1836) m. Louis II, Grand Duke of Hesse
 Prince Alexander of Hesse and by Rhine (1823–1888) m. Countess Julia von Hauke
 Prince Henry of Battenberg (1858–1896) m. Princess Beatrice of the United Kingdom
 Princess Victoria Eugenie of Battenberg (1887–1969) m. Alfonso XIII of Spain
 Infante Juan, Count of Barcelona (1913–1993) m. Princess María de las Mercedes of Bourbon-Two Sicilies
 Juan Carlos I of Spain (1938–) m. Princess Sophia of Greece and Denmark
 Felipe VI of Spain (1968–) m. Letizia Ortiz Rocasolano
 Leonor, Princess of Asturias (2005–)

 Louis IX and Caroline
 Princess Louise of Hesse-Darmstadt (1757–1830) m. Karl August, Grand Duke of Saxe-Weimar-Eisenach
 Princess Caroline Louise of Saxe-Weimar-Eisenach (1786–1816) m. Frederick Louis, Hereditary Grand Duke of Mecklenburg-Schwerin
 Duchess Helene of Mecklenburg-Schwerin (1814–1856) m. Ferdinand Philippe, Duke of Orléans
 Prince Philippe, Count of Paris (1838–1894) m. Princess Marie Isabelle of Orléans
 Princess Louise of Orléans (1882–1958) m. Prince Carlos of Bourbon-Two Sicilies
 Princess María de las Mercedes of Bourbon-Two Sicilies (1910–2000) m. Infante Juan, Count of Barcelona
 Juan Carlos I of Spain (1938–) m. Princess Sophia of Greece and Denmark
 Felipe VI of Spain (1968–) m. Letizia Ortiz Rocasolano
 Leonor, Princess of Asturias (2005–)

 Louis IX and Caroline
 Princess Louise of Hesse-Darmstadt (1757–1830) m. Karl August, Grand Duke of Saxe-Weimar-Eisenach
 Charles Frederick, Grand Duke of Saxe-Weimar-Eisenach (1783–1853) m. Grand Duchess Maria Pavlovna of Russia
 Princess Augusta of Saxe-Weimar-Eisenach (1811–1890) m. William I, German Emperor
 Frederick III, German Emperor (1831–1888) m. Victoria, Princess Royal
 Wilhelm II, German Emperor (1859–1941) m. Princess Augusta Victoria of Schleswig-Holstein
 Princess Victoria Louise of Prussia (1892–1980) m. Ernest Augustus, Duke of Brunswick
 Princess Frederica of Hanover (1917–1981) m. Paul of Greece
 Princess Sophia of Greece and Denmark (1938–) m. Juan Carlos I of Spain
 Felipe VI of Spain (1968–) m. Letizia Ortiz Rocasolano
 Leonor, Princess of Asturias (2005–)

 Louis IX and Caroline
 Princess Louise of Hesse-Darmstadt (1757–1830) m. Karl August, Grand Duke of Saxe-Weimar-Eisenach
 Charles Frederick, Grand Duke of Saxe-Weimar-Eisenach (1783–1853) m. Grand Duchess Maria Pavlovna of Russia
 Princess Augusta of Saxe-Weimar-Eisenach (1811–1890) m. William I, German Emperor
 Frederick III, German Emperor (1831–1888) m. Victoria, Princess Royal
 Princess Sophia of Prussia (1870–1932) m. Constantine I of Greece
 Paul of Greece (1901–1964) m. Princess Frederica of Hanover
 Princess Sophia of Greece and Denmark (1938–) m. Juan Carlos I of Spain
 Felipe VI of Spain (1968–) m. Letizia Ortiz Rocasolano
 Leonor, Princess of Asturias (2005–)

 Louis IX and Caroline
 Princess Frederica Louisa of Hesse-Darmstadt (1751–1805) m. Frederick William II of Prussia
 Frederick William III of Prussia (1770–1840) m. Duchess Louise of Mecklenburg-Strelitz
 William I, German Emperor (1797–1888) m. Princess Augusta of Saxe-Weimar-Eisenach
 Frederick III, German Emperor (1831–1888) m. Victoria, Princess Royal
 Princess Sophia of Prussia (1870–1932) m. Constantine I of Greece
 Paul of Greece (1901–1964) m. Princess Frederica of Hanover
 Princess Sophia of Greece and Denmark (1938–) m. Juan Carlos I of Spain
 Felipe VI of Spain (1968–) m. Letizia Ortiz Rocasolano
 Leonor, Princess of Asturias (2005–)

 Louis IX and Caroline
 Princess Frederica Louisa of Hesse-Darmstadt (1751–1805) m. Frederick William II of Prussia
 Frederick William III of Prussia (1770–1840) m. Duchess Louise of Mecklenburg-Strelitz
 William I, German Emperor (1797–1888) m. Princess Augusta of Saxe-Weimar-Eisenach
 Frederick III, German Emperor (1831–1888) m. Victoria, Princess Royal
 Wilhelm II, German Emperor (1859–1941) m. Princess Augusta Victoria of Schleswig-Holstein
 Princess Victoria Louise of Prussia (1892–1980) m. Ernest Augustus, Duke of Brunswick
 Princess Frederica of Hanover (1917–1981) m. Paul of Greece
 Princess Sophia of Greece and Denmark (1938–) m. Juan Carlos I of Spain
 Felipe VI of Spain (1968–) m. Letizia Ortiz Rocasolano
 Leonor, Princess of Asturias (2005–)

 Louis IX and Caroline
 Princess Frederica Louisa of Hesse-Darmstadt (1751–1805) m. Frederick William II of Prussia
 Frederick William III of Prussia (1770–1840) m. Duchess Louise of Mecklenburg-Strelitz
 Princess Charlotte of Prussia (1798–1860) m. Nicholas I of Russia
 Grand Duke Konstantin Nikolayevich of Russia (1827–1892) m. Princess Alexandra of Saxe-Altenburg
 Grand Duchess Olga Constantinovna of Russia (1851–1926) m. George I of Greece
 Constantine I of Greece (1868–1923) m. Princess Sophia of Prussia
 Paul of Greece (1901–1964) m. Princess Frederica of Hanover
 Princess Sophia of Greece and Denmark (1938–) m. Juan Carlos I of Spain
 Felipe VI of Spain (1968–) m. Letizia Ortiz Rocasolano
 Leonor, Princess of Asturias (2005–)

Sweden

 Louis IX and Caroline
 Princess Amalie of Hesse-Darmstadt (1754–1832) m. Charles Louis, Hereditary Prince of Baden
 Princess Frederica of Baden (1781–1826) m. Gustav IV Adolf of Sweden
 Princess Sophie of Sweden (1801–1865) m. Leopold, Grand Duke of Baden
 Frederick I, Grand Duke of Baden (1826–1907) m. Princess Louise of Prussia
 Princess Victoria of Baden (1862–1930) m. Gustaf V of Sweden
 Gustaf VI Adolf of Sweden (1882–1973) m. Princess Margaret of Connaught 
 Prince Gustaf Adolf, Duke of Västerbotten (1906–1947) m. Princess Sibylla of Saxe-Coburg and Gotha
 Carl XVI Gustaf of Sweden (1946–) m. Silvia Sommerlath
 Victoria, Crown Princess of Sweden (1977–) m. Daniel Westling
 Princess Estelle, Duchess of Östergötland (2012–)

 Louis IX and Caroline
 Princess Frederica Louisa of Hesse-Darmstadt (1751–1805) m. Frederick William II of Prussia
 Frederick William III of Prussia (1770–1840) m. Duchess Louise of Mecklenburg-Strelitz
 William I, German Emperor (1797–1888) m. Princess Augusta of Saxe-Weimar-Eisenach
 Princess Louise of Prussia (1838–1923) m. Frederick I, Grand Duke of Baden
 Princess Victoria of Baden (1862–1930) m. Gustaf V of Sweden
 Gustaf VI Adolf of Sweden (1882–1973) m. Princess Margaret of Connaught 
 Prince Gustaf Adolf, Duke of Västerbotten (1906–1947) m. Princess Sibylla of Saxe-Coburg and Gotha
 Carl XVI Gustaf of Sweden (1946–) m. Silvia Sommerlath
 Victoria, Crown Princess of Sweden (1977–) m. Daniel Westling
 Princess Estelle, Duchess of Östergötland (2012–)

 Louis IX and Caroline
 Princess Louise of Hesse-Darmstadt (1757–1830) m. Karl August, Grand Duke of Saxe-Weimar-Eisenach
 Charles Frederick, Grand Duke of Saxe-Weimar-Eisenach (1783–1853) m. Grand Duchess Maria Pavlovna of Russia
 Princess Augusta of Saxe-Weimar-Eisenach (1811–1890) m. William I, German Emperor
 Princess Louise of Prussia (1838–1923) m. Frederick I, Grand Duke of Baden
 Princess Victoria of Baden (1862–1930) m. Gustaf V of Sweden
 Gustaf VI Adolf of Sweden (1882–1973) m. Princess Margaret of Connaught 
 Prince Gustaf Adolf, Duke of Västerbotten (1906–1947) m. Princess Sibylla of Saxe-Coburg and Gotha
 Carl XVI Gustaf of Sweden (1946–) m. Silvia Sommerlath
 Victoria, Crown Princess of Sweden (1977–) m. Daniel Westling
 Princess Estelle, Duchess of Östergötland (2012–)

 Louis IX and Caroline
 Princess Frederica Louisa of Hesse-Darmstadt (1751–1805), m. Frederick William II of Prussia
 Frederick William III of Prussia (1770–1840) m. Duchess Louise of Mecklenburg-Strelitz
 Prince Charles of Prussia (1801–1883) m. Princess Marie of Saxe-Weimar-Eisenach
 Prince Friedrich Karl of Prussia (1828–1885) m. Princess Maria Anna of Anhalt-Dessau
 Princess Louise Margaret of Prussia (1860–1917) m. Prince Arthur, Duke of Connaught and Strathearn
 Princess Margaret of Connaught (1882–1920) m. Gustaf VI Adolf of Sweden
 Prince Gustaf Adolf, Duke of Västerbotten (1906–1947) m. Princess Sibylla of Saxe-Coburg and Gotha
 Carl XVI Gustaf of Sweden (1946–) m. Silvia Sommerlath
 Victoria, Crown Princess of Sweden (1977–) m. Daniel Westling
 Princess Estelle, Duchess of Östergötland (2012–)

 Louis IX and Caroline
 Princess Louise of Hesse-Darmstadt (1757–1830) m. Karl August, Grand Duke of Saxe-Weimar-Eisenach
 Charles Frederick, Grand Duke of Saxe-Weimar-Eisenach (1783–1853) m. Grand Duchess Maria Pavlovna of Russia
 Princess Marie of Saxe-Weimar-Eisenach (1808–1877) m. Prince Charles of Prussia
 Prince Friedrich Karl of Prussia (1828–1885) m. Princess Maria Anna of Anhalt-Dessau
 Princess Louise Margaret of Prussia (1860–1917) m. Prince Arthur, Duke of Connaught and Strathearn
 Princess Margaret of Connaught (1882–1920) m. Gustaf VI Adolf of Sweden
 Prince Gustaf Adolf, Duke of Västerbotten (1906–1947) m. Princess Sibylla of Saxe-Coburg and Gotha
 Carl XVI Gustaf of Sweden (1946–) m. Silvia Sommerlath
 Victoria, Crown Princess of Sweden (1977–) m. Daniel Westling
 Princess Estelle, Duchess of Östergötland (2012–)

 Louis IX and Caroline
 Princess Frederica Louisa of Hesse-Darmstadt (1751–1805) m. Frederick William II of Prussia
 Prince Louis Charles of Prussia (1773–1796) m. Duchess Frederica of Mecklenburg-Strelitz
 Princess Frederica of Prussia (1796–1850) m. Leopold IV, Duke of Anhalt
 Princess Maria Anna of Anhalt-Dessau (1837–1906) m. Prince Friedrich Karl of Prussia
 Princess Louise Margaret of Prussia (1860–1917) m. Prince Arthur, Duke of Connaught and Strathearn
 Princess Margaret of Connaught (1882–1920) m. Gustaf VI Adolf of Sweden
 Prince Gustaf Adolf, Duke of Västerbotten (1906–1947) m. Princess Sibylla of Saxe-Coburg and Gotha
 Carl XVI Gustaf of Sweden (1946–) m. Silvia Sommerlath
 Victoria, Crown Princess of Sweden (1977–) m. Daniel Westling
 Princess Estelle, Duchess of Östergötland (2012–)

 Louis IX and Caroline
 Princess Caroline of Hesse-Darmstadt (1746–1821) m. Frederick V, Landgrave of Hesse-Homburg
 Princess Amalie of Hesse-Homburg (1774–1846) m. Frederick, Hereditary Prince of Anhalt-Dessau
 Leopold IV, Duke of Anhalt (1794–1871) m. Princess Frederica of Prussia
 Princess Maria Anna of Anhalt-Dessau (1837–1906) m. Prince Friedrich Karl of Prussia
 Princess Louise Margaret of Prussia (1860–1917) m. Prince Arthur, Duke of Connaught and Strathearn
 Princess Margaret of Connaught (1882–1920) m. Gustaf VI Adolf of Sweden
 Prince Gustaf Adolf, Duke of Västerbotten (1906–1947) m. Princess Sibylla of Saxe-Coburg and Gotha
 Carl XVI Gustaf of Sweden (1946–) m. Silvia Sommerlath
 Victoria, Crown Princess of Sweden (1977–) m. Daniel Westling
 Princess Estelle, Duchess of Östergötland (2012–)

United Kingdom

 Louis IX and Caroline
 Princess Frederica Louisa of Hesse-Darmstadt (1751–1805), m. Frederick William II of Prussia
 Frederick William III of Prussia (1770–1840) m. Duchess Louise of Mecklenburg-Strelitz
 Princess Charlotte of Prussia (1798–1860) m. Nicholas I of Russia
 Grand Duke Konstantin Nikolayevich of Russia (1827–1892) m. Princess Alexandra of Saxe-Altenburg
 Grand Duchess Olga Constantinovna of Russia (1851–1926) m. George I of Greece
 Prince Andrew of Greece and Denmark (1882–1944) m. Princess Alice of Battenberg
 Prince Philip of Greece and Denmark (1921–2021) m. Elizabeth II of the United Kingdom
 Charles III of the United Kingdom (1948–) m. Lady Diana Spencer
 William, Prince of Wales (1982–) m. Catherine Middleton
 Prince George of Wales (2013–)

 Louis IX and Caroline
 Princess Frederica Louisa of Hesse-Darmstadt (1751–1805), m. Frederick William II of Prussia
 Prince Wilhelm of Prussia (1783–1851) m. Princess Maria Anna of Hesse-Homburg
 Princess Elisabeth of Prussia (1815–1885) m. Prince Charles of Hesse and by Rhine
 Louis IV, Grand Duke of Hesse (1837–1892) m. Princess Alice of the United Kingdom
 Princess Victoria of Hesse and by Rhine (1863–1950) m. Prince Louis of Battenberg
 Princess Alice of Battenberg (1885–1969) m. Prince Andrew of Greece and Denmark
 Prince Philip of Greece and Denmark (1921–2021) m. Elizabeth II of the United Kingdom
 Charles III of the United Kingdom (1948–) m. Lady Diana Spencer
 William, Prince of Wales (1982–) m. Catherine Middleton
 Prince George of Wales (2013–)

 Louis IX and Caroline
 Princess Caroline of Hesse-Darmstadt (1746–1821) m. Frederick V, Landgrave of Hesse-Homburg
 Princess Maria Anna of Hesse-Homburg (1785–1846) m. Prince Wilhelm of Prussia
 Princess Elisabeth of Prussia (1815–1885) m. Prince Charles of Hesse and by Rhine
 Louis IV, Grand Duke of Hesse (1837–1892) m. Princess Alice of the United Kingdom
 Princess Victoria of Hesse and by Rhine (1863–1950) m. Prince Louis of Battenberg
 Princess Alice of Battenberg (1885–1969) m. Prince Andrew of Greece and Denmark
 Prince Philip of Greece and Denmark (1921–2021) m. Elizabeth II of the United Kingdom
 Charles III of the United Kingdom (1948–) m. Lady Diana Spencer
 William, Prince of Wales (1982–) m. Catherine Middleton
 Prince George of Wales (2013–)

 Louis IX and Caroline
 Louis I, Grand Duke of Hesse (1753–1830) m. Princess Louise of Hesse-Darmstadt
 Louis II, Grand Duke of Hesse (1777–1848) m. Princess Wilhelmine of Baden
 Prince Charles of Hesse and by Rhine (1809–1877) m. Princess Elisabeth of Prussia
 Louis IV, Grand Duke of Hesse (1837–1892) m. Princess Alice of the United Kingdom
 Princess Victoria of Hesse and by Rhine (1863–1950) m. Prince Louis of Battenberg
 Princess Alice of Battenberg (1885–1969) m. Prince Andrew of Greece and Denmark
 Prince Philip of Greece and Denmark (1921–2021) m. Elizabeth II of the United Kingdom
 Charles III of the United Kingdom (1948–) m. Lady Diana Spencer
 William, Prince of Wales (1982–) m. Catherine Middleton
 Prince George of Wales (2013–)

 Louis IX and Caroline
 Louis I, Grand Duke of Hesse (1753–1830) m. Princess Louise of Hesse-Darmstadt
 Louis II, Grand Duke of Hesse (1777–1848) m. Princess Wilhelmine of Baden
 Prince Alexander of Hesse and by Rhine (1823–1888) m. Countess Julia von Hauke
 Prince Louis of Battenberg (1854–1921) m. Princess Victoria of Hesse and by Rhine
 Princess Alice of Battenberg (1885–1969) m. Prince Andrew of Greece and Denmark
 Prince Philip of Greece and Denmark (1921–2021) m. Elizabeth II of the United Kingdom
 Charles III of the United Kingdom (1948–) m. Lady Diana Spencer
 William, Prince of Wales (1982–) m. Catherine Middleton
 Prince George of Wales (2013–)

 Louis IX and Caroline
 Princess Amalie of Hesse-Darmstadt (1754–1832) m. Charles Louis, Hereditary Prince of Baden
 Princess Wilhelmine of Baden (1788–1836) m. Louis II, Grand Duke of Hesse
 Prince Alexander of Hesse and by Rhine (1823–1888) m. Countess Julia von Hauke
 Prince Louis of Battenberg (1854–1921) m. Princess Victoria of Hesse and by Rhine
 Princess Alice of Battenberg (1885–1969) m. Prince Andrew of Greece and Denmark
 Prince Philip of Greece and Denmark (1921–2021) m. Elizabeth II of the United Kingdom
 Charles III of the United Kingdom (1948–) m. Lady Diana Spencer
 William, Prince of Wales (1982–) m. Catherine Middleton
 Prince George of Wales (2013–)

 Louis IX and Caroline
 Princess Amalie of Hesse-Darmstadt (1754–1832) m. Charles Louis, Hereditary Prince of Baden
 Princess Wilhelmine of Baden (1788–1836) m. Louis II, Grand Duke of Hesse
 Prince Charles of Hesse and by Rhine (1809–1877) m. Princess Elisabeth of Prussia
 Louis IV, Grand Duke of Hesse (1837–1892) m. Princess Alice of the United Kingdom
 Princess Victoria of Hesse and by Rhine (1863–1950) m. Prince Louis of Battenberg
 Princess Alice of Battenberg (1885–1969) m. Prince Andrew of Greece and Denmark
 Prince Philip of Greece and Denmark (1921–2021) m. Elizabeth II of the United Kingdom
 Charles III of the United Kingdom (1948–) m. Lady Diana Spencer
 William, Prince of Wales (1982–) m. Catherine Middleton
 Prince George of Wales (2013–)

References

External links

Wikisource: Allgemeine Deutsche Biographie "Ludwig (Landgraf von Hessen-Darmstadt)" (in German)

Landgraves of Hesse-Darmstadt
1719 births
1790 deaths
Nobility from Darmstadt
Generals of the Holy Roman Empire